Zapolyarny is a town in Pechengsky District of Murmansk Oblast, Russia, located on the Kola Peninsula,  northeast of the Kola Superdeep Borehole project. Population: 

The area where the town is located belonged to Finland in 1920–1944. It was founded in 1956 as Zhdanovsk and was granted work settlement status and later given its present name.

On February 1, 1963, by the Decree by the Presidium of the Supreme Soviet of the RSFSR, Zapolyarny was elevated in status to that of a town of district significance.

It is the nearest town to the disused Koshka Yavr naval air station.

References

Notes

Sources

Cities and towns built in the Soviet Union
Populated places established in 1956
Cities and towns in Murmansk Oblast
Former urban-type settlements of Murmansk Oblast